Cash and carry may refer to:

Cash and Carry (game show), the first network-televised game show
Cash and carry (World War II), a revision of the Neutrality Acts, designed to aid the British
Cash and carry (wholesale), a type of sales operation within the wholesale sector
Cash and Carry (film), a 1937 Three Stooges short film
Cash and Carry, alternate title of the 1941 film Ringside Maisie
Cash & Carry, the United States grocery chain
Kash n' Karry, the United States supermarket chain
Basis trading, a form of arbitrage in which securities are bought in the cash market
An episode of the animated TV-series Garfield and Friends